The Critics' Choice Television Award for Best Supporting Actress in a Comedy Series is one of the award categories presented annually by the Critics' Choice Television Awards (BTJA) to recognize the work done by television actresses.

Winners and nominees

2010s

2020s

Multiple wins
2 wins
 Mayim Bialik
 Alex Borstein (consecutive)
 Allison Janney (consecutive)
 Hannah Waddingham (consecutive)

Multiple nominations
5 nominations
 Eden Sher

4 nominations
 Mayim Bialik
 Allison Janney
 Rita Moreno

3 nominations
 Alex Borstein
 Julie Bowen
 Betty Gilpin
 Judith Light

2 nominations
 Kaley Cuoco
 Jane Krakowski
 Annie Murphy
 Annie Potts
 Molly Shannon
 Hannah Waddingham
 Casey Wilson

See also
 TCA Award for Individual Achievement in Comedy
 Primetime Emmy Award for Outstanding Supporting Actress in a Comedy Series
 Golden Globe Award for Best Supporting Actress – Series, Miniseries or Television Film

References

External links
 

Critics' Choice Television Awards
Television awards for Best Supporting Actress